Lost Songs is a compilation album of previously unreleased material by the Appleseed Cast, released on Deep Elm Records in 2002 (see 2002 in music).

Track listing
"E to W" (3:43)
"Peril (Parts 1, 2 and 3)" (6:57)
"Novice" (4:24)
"Facing North" (3:42)
"Take" (2:13)
"State N w/K" (2:38)
"House on a Hill" (5:51)
"Beach Gray" (3:06)
"Novice Ambient Cannibalization" (7:26)

References

External links
Lost Songs on Deep Elm Records

2002 albums
The Appleseed Cast albums